A Commune is the third-level administrative unit in Mali. Mali is divided into eight regions and one capital district (Bamako). These subdivisions bear the name of their principal city. The regions are divided into 49 Cercles. The Cercles and the district are divided into 703 Communes, with 36 Urban Communes and 667 Rural Communes, while some larger Cercles still contain Arrondissements above the Commune level, these are organisational areas with no independent power or office.  Rural Communes are subdivided in Villages, while Urban Communes are subdivided into Quartier (wards or quarters). Communes usually bear the name of their principal town. The capital, Bamako, consists of six Urban Communes. There were initially 701 communes until the Law No. 01-043 of 7 June 2001 created two new Rural Communes in the desert region in the north east of the country: Alata, Ménaka Cercle in the Gao Region and Intadjedite, Tin-Essako Cercle in the Kidal Region.

Not every built up area (which might be described as a town) is a Commune, and not every Commune (especially Rural Communes) contains a large town.  In most cases where towns and Communes coincide, Commune borders extend beyond built up areas and are, like the Communes of France on which they were based during the colonial period, an administrative structure.  Unlike French Communes, they are not the lowest level administrative structure of the nation. 

Legally, the Commune structure was created by Law no 96- 059/AN- RM of 4 November 1996. The communes generally retain the same boundaries as the former arrondissements. Commune affairs are directed by a Commune Council (conseil communal) of elected members and a Commune executive (bureau communal) of the elected Mayor and three adjutants. The executive is tasked with carrying out the directives voted by the Council.  National policies are carried out by a Sub-Prefect (sous préfet), who also carries out certain of the Council's directives over the local arms or national bodies.

The communes are listed below:

See also
List of cities in Mali
List of Arrondissements of Mali

References

External links
. Includes GIS data files for Mali.
Statsoid.com : Mali
MATCL - MINISTERE DE L'ADMINISTRATION TERRITORIALE ET DES COLLECTIVITES LOCALES: Government of the Republic of Mali.
Maplibrary: vector maps of national subdivisions of Mali.

 
Subdivisions of Mali
Mali 3
Communes, Mali